Grindstone is a freeware Microsoft Windows desktop application that allows users to create and organize tasks and to track time. The application features a Task List window for managing tasks and time, a desktop gadget-like stopwatch for controlling the timer, and can produce reports and detect when the user is away. In addition, Grindstone can synchronize time tracking data for multiple users via a paid service called Task Force.

History

See also
 Comparison of time tracking software
 Timesheet

References

Time-tracking software
Windows-only freeware